Bernardine a Piconio (Henri Bernardine de Picquigny) (1633 – 8 December 1709) was a French Capuchin theologian and exegete.

He was born and educated at Picquigny, Picardy, and joined the Capuchins in 1649. As professor of theology he shed great lustre upon his order; his best-known work is his Triplex expositio epistolarum sancti Pauli (Paris, 1703 [French], 1706 [English, tr. Prichard], London, 1888), popular among Scriptural scholars. Piconio also wrote Triplex expositio in sacrosancta D. N. Jesu Christi Evangelia (Paris, 1726), and a book of moral instructions. A complete edition of his works, Opera omnia Bernardini a Piconio, was published at Paris (1870–1872). He died in Paris.

Notes

References
Attribution
 Cites as a source:
Hugo von Hurter, Nomenclator literarius, II, 788

1633 births
1709 deaths
Capuchins
Roman Catholic biblical scholars
17th-century French Catholic theologians
17th-century French Roman Catholic priests